Matthew Wallace (born 12 April 1990) is an English professional golfer currently playing on the European Tour and the PGA Tour.

Collegiate career
After growing up in Pinner England and going to Aldenham School, Wallace attended Jacksonville State University, in Northeast Alabama, as a freshman in the 2010–11 season before turning professional. His year in Jacksonville was a successful one that saw him win twice, including the 2011 OVC Championship. He was the OVC Freshman of the Year and held the record for lowest round in school history with a 10-under 62 in the F&M Bank APSU Intercollegiate.

Professional career
In 2016 Wallace won six tournaments on the Alps Tour and won the Order of Merit. This enabled him to join the Challenge Tour in 2017. He started 2017 by finishing tied for third place in the Barclays Kenya Open and in May he won the Open de Portugal, a dual-ranking event with the main European Tour. The win gave him promotion to the European Tour.

2018: Breakout season
Wallace won his second European Tour event in March 2018, Hero Indian Open, beating Andrew Johnston in a playoff, making a birdie at the first extra hole. The win lifted him into the world top 100 for the first time. In June Wallace won again at the BMW International Open. He started the final round two strokes behind the leaders, but carded a bogey-free round of 65 to take the title by one stroke. He followed that up with a victory at Made in Denmark in September 2018, collecting birdies at five of the last six holes before coming out on top in a four-man playoff. He finished in a share of fifth at the Nedbank Golf Challenge before tying for second at the season-ending DP World Tour Championship, Dubai to move into the top 50 of the Official World Golf Ranking for the first time.

2019 to present
In May 2019, Wallace finished joint 3rd at the PGA Championship and in the same year, came 12th at the US Open at Pebble Beach and sixth at the Arnold Palmer Invitational, as well as second at the Dubai Desert Classic and British Masters and third at the BMW International Open and KLM Open. 

In his first full season on the PGA Tour in 2019–20, Wallace finished in a share of fourth at Memorial Tournament and T12 at the Rocket Mortgage Classic.

In April 2021, Wallace recorded his joint-best finish on the PGA Tour with a solo-third finish at the Valero Texas Open. He was tied for the lead with Jordan Spieth after 54 holes. He went on to finish 111th in the FedEx Cup standings.

Wallace started his 2021–22 PGA Tour season with a share of 14th place at the Shriners Children's Open and fourth place at the Zozo Championship in October 2021 and a share of 10th place at the Rocket Mortgage Classic helped him retain his PGA Tour status for a fourth year, ending the season in 120th place in the FedEx Cup standings.

Wallace finished runner-up at the 2022 Omega European Masters in August. He was defeated in a playoff by Thriston Lawrence.

Wallace was selected to play in the inaugural Hero Cup in January 2023, representing the Great Britain and Ireland team, facing Continental Europe, contributing 2.5 points from a possible four, including a singles victory over Thomas Detry, in his team's defeat.

Professional wins (10)

European Tour wins (4)

1Dual-ranking event with the Challenge Tour
2Co-sanctioned with the Asian Tour

European Tour playoff record (2–1)

Challenge Tour wins (1)

1Dual-ranking event with the European Tour

Alps Tour wins (6)

Results in major championships
Results not in chronological order in 2020.

CUT = missed the half-way cut
"T" indicates a tie for a place
NT = No tournament due to COVID-19 pandemic

Results in The Players Championship

"T" indicates a tie for a place
CUT = missed the halfway cut
C = Cancelled after the first round due to the COVID-19 pandemic

Results in World Golf Championships

1Cancelled due to COVID-19 pandemic

QF, R16, R32, R64 = Round in which player lost in match play
NT = no tournament
"T" = tied

Team appearances
Professional
Hero Cup (representing Great Britain & Ireland): 2023

References

External links

English male golfers
Jacksonville State Gamecocks men's golfers
European Tour golfers
People from Hillingdon
People from Sunningdale
1990 births
Living people